Orthochromis mosoensis is a species of cichlid endemic to Burundi where it is only known to occur in the upper Malagarasi River drainage.  This species can reach a length of  SL.

References

External links

mosoensis
Fish described in 1998
Taxa named by Lothar Seegers
Fish of Burundi
Endemic fauna of Burundi
Taxonomy articles created by Polbot